Edwin A. "Eddie Day" Pashinski (born July 2, 1945) is a Democratic member of the Pennsylvania House of Representatives for the 121st District who was elected in 2006. His district includes Wilkes-Barre, Wilkes-Barre Township, Ashley, Plains Township and  two wards in Hanover Township, all in Luzerne County.

Pashinski earned a bachelor's degree in Music Education at Wilkes University and a Master's Equivalency at Penn State University. During college, he was involved in a band called The Starfires, income from which helped pay his tuition. After college, Pashinski began teaching at the Greater Nanticoke Area School District.  He served for 35 years as a teacher, choral director and teachers' union leader. He is of Polish descent.

After retiring, Pashinski ran for the seat of Rep. Kevin Blaum, who was not seeking re-election.  Pashinski prevailed over a field of three candidates in the 2006 Democratic primary election with 34.1%., overcoming a strong fundraising led by optometrist Brian O'Donnell.

In the 2006 general election, he defeated Republican Christine Katsock with 64.9% of the vote.

Pashinski currently sits on Agriculture & Rural Affairs committee as the Democratic Chair.

References

External links

State Representative Eddie Day Pashinski  official PA House website
State Representative Eddie Day Pashinski  official Party website

Follow the Money - Eddie Day Pashinski
2006 campaign contributions

Democratic Party members of the Pennsylvania House of Representatives
Living people
Wilkes University alumni
Pennsylvania State University alumni
Politicians from Wilkes-Barre, Pennsylvania
1945 births
American politicians of Polish descent
21st-century American politicians